"How Deep Is Your Love?" is a song by American dance-punk band The Rapture. It was initially released as the lead single from the band's third studio album In the Grace of Your Love on June 13, 2011 as a single-sided 12-inch single through DFA Records. The song was remixed by Emperor Machine, as part of Adult Swim's 2011 Singles Program. The song peaked at number 19 on the Belgian Flanders Tip singles chart.

Music video
The official music video for the song, using a shorter edit of the song lasting only three minutes and forty-five seconds, was uploaded on April 24, 2012 to the official YouTube channel for Noisey, the music subsidiary for the magazine Vice.

Track listing

12" releases
 dfa 2298

 dfa 2304

 dfa 2321

Digital downloads

Charts

Release history

References

2011 singles
2011 songs
The Rapture (band) songs